There were two Scotby railway stations situated in the village of Scotby, two miles outside of Carlisle, England. Both have closed.

Newcastle and Carlisle Railway

This railway station was originally built to help accommodate the two tanneries located in the village. The station was closed in 1959, due to financial problems, some 4 years before the Beeching Axe.

Settle-Carlisle Railway

The Settle-Carlisle Railway station was designed by the Midland Railway company architect John Holloway Sanders.

It was closed in February 1942. Since then, the station yard has been sold for housing, so the former station building and the former station master's house now form part of a row of houses which back onto the railway line, which is still in use.

Stationmasters

G.W. Fenton 1876 - 1877
R. Oakes 1877 - 1878
J. Williams 1878 - 1879
William Dawson 1879 - 1904 
Joseph Henry Wildgoose 1904 - 1908 (afterwards station master at Attenborough)

References

External links 

 Scotby Station on the Newcastle and Carlisle Railway

Disused railway stations in Cumbria
Former North Eastern Railway (UK) stations
Railway stations in Great Britain opened in 1836
Railway stations in Great Britain closed in 1959
Former Midland Railway stations
Railway stations in Great Britain opened in 1876
Railway stations in Great Britain closed in 1942
John Holloway Sanders railway stations
Wetheral